Ramkhamhaeng Road is a main road in east Bangkok, Thailand. It's named after Ramkhamhaeng University (RU), Thailand's first open university that it runs through. The name is also the surrounding area.

Route
It can be divided into two phases:

First phase
The road starts at Khlong Tan Intersection in Suan Luang District, where it cuts with Phetchaburi, Soi Sukhumvit 71 (Pridi Banomyong Road), and Phatthanakan Roads, as a continuation of Pridi Banomyong Road. Then northeastward through Ramkhamhaeng Intersection, where it cuts across Rama IX Road, through the entrance of Wat Thepleela temple and Ramkhamhaeng University, Sports Authority of Thailand (location of Rajamangala National Stadium and Indoor Stadium Huamark), up until ends at Lam Sali Intersection in Bang Kapi District near Bang Kapi District Office and Tha Mall Bangkapi.

This first phase is considered a road in the downtown. There is an overpass along the road direction from Soi Ramkhamhaeng 13 in front of The Mall Ramkhamhaeng up until Soi Ramkhamhaeng 81/4. Only this phase is one of Bangkok's busiest traffic areas.

Two shortcuts to Phlapphla Subdistrict in Wang Thonglang District were Soi Ramkhamhaeng 39 or Soi Wat Thepleela, the location of Wat Thepleela and former site of Wang Thonglang District Office; and Soi Ramkhamhaeng 65 or Soi Mahadthai which crosses the Khlong Saen Saeb canal lead to Lat Phrao Road in the opposite side of Ladprao General Hospital, where it is referred to as Soi Lat Phrao 122.

Second phase
This phase was formerly known as "Sukhaphiban 3 Road" (ถนนสุขาภิบาล 3). Only this phase is considered the road running through the suburbs of Bangkok.

Famous places along the road include Wat Sriboonreung and Wat Bang Peng Tai temples (location of Khwan Riam Floating Market), Ruamrudee International School (RIS).

Transportation
MRT Orange Line (under construction)

References

Streets in Bangkok
Suan Luang district
Bang Kapi district
Saphan Sung district
Min Buri district
Neighbourhoods of Bangkok